Livermore is a surname. Notable people with the surname include:

 Caroline Sealy Livermore (1885–1968), American conservationist
Cathy Livermore, New Zealand artist, dancer and educator
 David Livermore (born 1980), English footballer
 Doug Livermore (born 1947), English footballer
 Edward St. Loe Livermore (1762–1832), member of the U.S. House of Representatives from Massachusetts's 3rd District in 1807–1809
 Jake Livermore (born 1989), English footballer 
 Jesse Lauriston Livermore (1877–1940), American stock trader
 John Livermore (1918–2013), Nevada gold geologist
 Kirsten Livermore (born 1969), Australian politician
 Mary Livermore (1820–1905), American suffragist
 Reg Livermore (born 1938), Australian actor, singer and theatrical performer
 Robert Livermore (1799–1858), English emigrants to Mexico, landowner, the namesake of Livermore, California
 Samuel Livermore (1732–1803), American politician, New Hampshire Supreme Court justice and U.S. Congressman and Senator from that state
 Samuel Livermore (legal writer) (c. 1786–1833), American New Orleans lawyer known for his treatises on agency law and conflict of laws
 Spencer Livermore, Baron Livermore (born 1975), British politician
 Tracey Lynn Livermore (born 1973), professional name Brandi Love, American pornographic actress